Opium: Diary of a Madwoman is a 2007 Hungarian drama film directed by János Szász. It was entered into the 29th Moscow International Film Festival where Kirsti Stubø won the Silver George for Best Actress.

Cast
 Ulrich Thomsen as Dr. Brenner
 Kirsti Stubø as Gizella
 Zsolt László as Professor Winter
 Enikö Börcsök as Sister Hortenzia
 Gyöngyvér Bognár as Gizella's Room Mate
 Roland Rába

References

External links
 

2007 films
2007 drama films
Hungarian drama films
2000s Hungarian-language films
Films directed by János Szász
Films about opium